The Premier League Golden Glove is an annual association football award presented to the goalkeeper who has kept the most clean sheets in the Premier League. In football a team's defense or goalkeeper may be said to "keep a clean sheet" if they prevent their opponents from scoring any goals during an entire match. For sponsorship purposes, it has been referred to as the Barclays Golden Glove since its inception during the 2004–05 season until the 2015–16 season and as the Cadbury Golden Glove from 2017–18 season to 2019–20 season. For the 2020–21 season, it was known as the Coca-Cola Zero Sugar Golden Glove and for the 2021–22 season, it is known as the Castrol Golden Glove.

The Premier League was founded in 1992, when the clubs of the First Division left the Football League and established a new commercially independent league that negotiated its own broadcast and sponsorship agreements. Originally, the Golden Glove could only be won outright by a single player; should there have been a tie, the goalkeeper with the superior clean sheets-to-games ratio received the award. However, starting in the 2013–14 season, the Golden Glove is shared by goalkeepers with an equal number of clean sheets, regardless of the number of games they played.

In 2005, the inaugural Premier League Golden Glove was awarded to Petr Čech of Chelsea. Čech's 24 clean sheets in a single season remains the current record. Since 2005 Čech and Joe Hart have won the award on the most occasions with four successes each, with Čech the only goalkeeper to have won the award with two different teams (Chelsea and Arsenal). Pepe Reina was the first goalkeeper to achieve back-to-back wins of the award, managing to do so in three consecutive seasons between 2005 and 2008. Joe Hart later repeated the achievement with Manchester City between 2010 and 2013, as did Ederson with the same club between 2020 and 2022.

During the 2008–09 season, Edwin van der Sar surpassed Čech's previous record of ten consecutive clean sheets by reaching fourteen. During his streak, Van der Sar went 1,311 minutes without conceding a goal. In the process, he broke both Čech's Premier League record (1,025 minutes), Steve Death's Football League record (1,103 minutes) and also the all-time league record in Britain (1,155 minutes) for most consecutive scoreless minutes.

Winners

Awards won by nationality

Awards won by club

See also 
 List of Premier League goalkeepers with 100 or more clean sheets

References 

Goal
Golden
Association football player non-biographical articles
Association football goalkeeper awards